The Shire of Hindmarsh is a local government area in Victoria, Australia, located in the western part of the state.

It includes the towns of Dimboola, Nhill, Rainbow and Jeparit.  It was formed in 1995 from the amalgamation of the Shire of Lowan and Shire of Dimboola.

The Shire is governed and administered by the Hindmarsh Shire Council; its seat of local government and administrative centre is located at the Council headquarters in Nhill, it also has service centres located in Dimboola, Rainbow and Jeparit. The Shire is named after the major geographical feature in the region, Lake Hindmarsh, (which in turn was named after John Hindmarsh) located in the east of the LGA.

Council

Current composition
The council is composed of three wards and six councillors, with two councillors per ward elected to represent each ward. The current councillors, in order of election at the 2020 election, are:

Administration and governance
The council meets in the council chambers at the council headquarters in the Nhill Municipal Offices, which is also the location of the council's administrative activities. It provides customer services at its administrative center in Nhill, and its service centers in Dimboola, Jeparit, and Rainbow.

Townships and localities
The 2021 census, the shire had a population of 5,698 down from 5,721 in the 2016 census

^ - Territory divided with another LGA

See also
List of places on the Victorian Heritage Register in the Shire of Hindmarsh

References

External links

Hindmarsh Shire Council official website
Metlink local public transport map

Local government areas of Victoria (Australia)
Grampians (region)
 
Wimmera